52 may refer to: 
 52 (number)
 one of the years 52 BC, AD 52, 1952, 2052
 52-hertz whale an individual male whale, also known as the loneliest whale, calling at the unusual 52 hertz range
 52 (comics), a 2006–07 American weekly comic book series